is a prime-time Japanese television detective series. It aired on Saturday nights in the 9:00–9:56 p.m. time slot on the Tokyo Broadcasting System (TBS) network from April 6, 1968 to April 7, 1973.  There were a total of 262 episodes, and it was one of the most popular action dramas in Japan at the time.

The story involved "Key Hunter", a special clandestine unit of the International Police, which endeavored to solve various crimes.

Key Hunter was a unique TV show, which started out as a grand scale spy thriller never before seen in Japan.  The episodes were individually themed on global crimes and political strife.  The initial hardboiled theme later evolved to include intellectual elements involving action, and occasionally with comical elements as well.

Tetsuro Tamba starred in the 1967 film You Only Live Twice as Japanese Secret Service agent Tiger Tanaka, an ally of James Bond.  This role greatly influenced his image in Key Hunter.

Characters

Key Hunter
 — played by Tetsuro Tamba
 ex-intelligence agent
 — played by Yōko Nogiwa
 ex-intelligence agent
 — played by Hiroshi Kawaguchi (since episode #60)
 ex-FBI agent
 — played by Hayato Tani
 power freak
 — played by Eiko Ōkawa
 memory expert & genius
 — played by Sonny Chiba
 ex-newspaper reporter

International Police
 — played by Noboru Nakaya (appeared very rarely)
 Chief of the Special Task Forces
  — played by Tadao Nakamaru (since episode #104)
  — played by Hiroshi Miyauchi (since episode #92)

Key Hunter Detective Agency
  — played by Masaya Oki (since episode #210)
 young private detective who admires Key Hunter members

Theme music
The theme song "Hijō no License" was written by Shunsuke Kikuchi, played as an instrumental for the opening theme, and sung by Yōko Nogiwa for the ending theme.

References

External links
DVD Selection from Toei

KeyHunter, at Beyond Japan Hero

1968 Japanese television series debuts
1973 Japanese television series endings
Japanese drama television series
Shunsuke Kikuchi
Detective television series
TBS Television (Japan) dramas
Japanese action television series
Japanese detective television drama series